Sa Pa (also written as Sapa) is a district-level town of Lào Cai Province in the Northwest region of Vietnam. As of 2018, the town had a population of 61,498. The town covers an area of 677 km2. The town capital lies at Sa Pa. It is one of the main market towns in the area, where several ethnic minority groups such as Hmong, Dao (Yao), Giáy, Xa Pho, and Tay live.

Administrative divisions
Sa Pa is subdivided to 16 commune-level subdivisions, including the 6 wards of: Cầu Mây, Hàm Rồng, Ô Quý Hồ, Phan Si Păng, Sa Pa, Sa Pa and 10 rural communes of: Bản Hồ, Hoàng Liên, Liên Minh, Mường Bo, Mường Hoa, Ngũ Chỉ Sơn, Tả Phìn, Tả Van, Thanh Bình and Trung Chải.

History

Sa Pa was a frontier township and capital of former Sa Pa District in Lào Cai Province in north-west Vietnam. It was first inhabited by people about whom nothing is known. They left in the entire valley hundreds of petroglyphs, mostly composed of lines, which experts think date from the 15th century and represent local cadastres. Then came the highland minorities of the Hmong and Yao. The township is one of the main market ones in the area, where several ethnic minority groups such as Hmong, Dao (Yao), Giáy, Pho Lu, and Tày live. These are the four main minority groups still present in Sa Pa district today. The Kinh (lowland Vietnamese) never originally colonised this highest of Việt Nam's valleys, which lies in the shadow of Phan-Xi-Pǎng (Fansipan, 3143 m), the highest peak in the country. Sa Pa is also home to more than 200 pieces of boulders with ancient engravings. The "Area of Old Carved Stone in Sapa" has been in the UNESCO tentative list since 1997.

It was only when the French debarked in highland Tonkin in the late 1880s that Sa Pa, name of the Hmong hamlet, with "S" is pronounced almost as hard as "Ch" in French, "Sh" in English, "S" in standard Vietnamese, so Chapa as the French called it, began to appear on the national map. Near to the now Sa Pa townlet is "Sa Pả commune", which shows the origin in Hmong language of the location name.

In the following decade, the future site of Sa Pa township started to see military parties as well as missionaries from the Société des Missions Etrangères de Paris (MEP) visit. The French military marched from the Red River Delta into the northern mountainous regions as part of Tonkin's ‘pacification’. In 1894-96 the border between China and Tonkin was formally agreed upon and the Sa Pa area, just to the south of this frontier, was placed under French authority. From 1891 the entire Lào Cai region, including Sa Pa, came under direct colonial military administration so as to curtail banditry and political resistance on the sensitive northern frontier.

The first permanent French civilian resident arrived in Sa Pa in 1909. With its attractive continental climate, health authorities believed the site had potential. By 1912 a military sanatorium for ailing officers had been erected along with a fully fledged military garrison. Then, from the 1920s onwards, several wealthy professionals with enough financial capital also had a number of private villas built in the vicinity.

At the end of the Second World War a long period of hostilities began in Tonkin that was to last until 1954. In the process, nearly all of the 200 or so colonial buildings in or around Sa Pa were destroyed, either by Việt Minh sympathisers in the late 1940s, or, in the early 1950s by French air raids. The vast majority of the Viet population fled for their lives, and the former township entered a prolonged sleep.

In the early 1960s, thanks to the New Economic Zones migration scheme set up by the new Socialist regime, new inhabitants from the lowlands started to migrate to the region.

The short 1979 occupation of the northern border region by Chinese troops had little impact on Sa Pa town, but did force the Kinh (lowland Vietnamese) population out for a month.

In 1993 the last obstacle to Sa Pa's full rebirth as a prominent holiday destination was lifted as the decision was made to open the door fully to international tourism. Sa Pa was back on the tourist trail again, this time for a newly emerging local elite tourist crowd, as well as international tourists.

Sa Pa is now in full economic boom, mainly from the thousands of tourists who come every year to walk the hundreds of miles of trekking trails between and around the villages of Dao villages of Ta Van and Ta Phin.

In 2006, the Chairman of The People's Committee of Sa Pa Province was elected to The Communist Party Central Committee as the youngest ever member (born in 1973).

Geography
Sa Pa District is in Lào Cai Province, northwest Vietnam, 380 km northwest of Hanoi close to the border with China. The Hoàng Liên Son range of mountains dominates the district, which is at the eastern extremity of the Himalayas. This range includes Vietnam's highest mountain, Fan Si Pan, at a height of 3143 m above sea level. In addition, other mountains like Aurora & J (where the sun appears at sunrise) complete a very steep terrain. The town of Sa Pa lies at an elevation of about 1500 meters (4,921 feet) elevation. The climate is moderate and rainy in summer (May—August), and foggy and cold with occasional snowfalls in winter.

Sa Pa is a quiet mountain town and home to a great diversity of ethnic minority peoples. The total population of 36,000 consists mostly of minority groups. Besides the Kinh (Viet) people (15 percent) there are mainly five ethnic groups in Sa Pa: Hmong 52 percent, Dao 25 percent, Tay five percent, Giay two percent, and a small number of Xa Pho. Approximately 7,000 live in Sa Pa, the other 36,000 being scattered in small communes throughout the district.

Most of the ethnic minority people work their land on sloping terraces since the vast majority of the land is mountainous. Their staple foods are rice and corn. Rice, by its very nature of being a labour-intensive crop, makes the daily fight for survival paramount. The unique climate in Sa Pa has a major influence on the ethnic minorities who live in the area. With sub-tropical summers, temperate winters and 160 days of mist annually, the influence on agricultural yields and health-related issues is significant.

The geographical location of the area makes it a truly unique place for many interesting plants and animals, allowing it to support many inhabitants. Many very rare or even endemic species have been recorded in the region.

The scenery of the Sa Pa region in large part reflects the relationship between the minority people and nature. This is seen especially in the paddy fields carpeting the rolling lower slopes of the Hoàng Liên Mountains. The impressive physical landscape which underlies this has resulted from the work of the elements over thousands of years, wearing away the underlying rock. On a clear day, the imposing peak of Fan Si Pan comes into view. The last major peak in the Himalayan chain, Fan Si Pan offers a real challenge to even the keenest walker, the opportunity of staggering views, and a rare glimpse of some of the last remaining primary rain forest in Vietnam.

Geology, climate and human activity have combined to produce a range of very distinct habitats around Sa Pa. Especially important is Sa Pa's geographic position, at the convergence of the world's 14 "biomes" (distinct biographic areas), producing an assemblage of plant and animal species unique in the world.

Ecological life

The Hoàng Liên Mountains are home to a rich variety of plants, birds, mammals, amphibians, reptiles and insects, many only found in north-western Vietnam. For this reason, the Hoàng Liên Nature Reserve was made a National Park in 2006, and covers much of the mountain range to the immediate south of Sa Pa.

Forest type and quality change with increasing altitude. At 2000 meters the natural, undisturbed forest begins to be seen. Above 2500 meters dwarf conifers and rhododendrons predominate in the harsh “elfin forest”, so called because a lack of topsoil and nutrients means that fully mature trees grow to measure only a few meters in height. Higher still, only the hardiest of plant species are found. At over 3000 meters, Fan Si Pan's summit can only support dwarf bamboo.

Topography
The Hoang Lien Mountains lie at the south-eastern extent of the Himalayan chain. The national park is located on the north-east flank of these mountains and includes Vietnam's highest peak, Fansipan, at 3,143 m (see map). The lowest point is 380 m but most of the national park lies above 1,000 m. The flanks of the mountains are very steep and many areas are almost inaccessible on foot. Between Fansipan Mountain and Sa Pa town, lies the Muong Hoa valley, which has been terraced for wet rice agriculture. This valley becomes wider towards the east of the national park.

Climate

The climate of Hoàng Liên National Park is unique in Vietnam. It is highly seasonal, with a subtropical climate in the summer and a temperate climate during the winter. The warmest months are July and August, and the coldest months are December and January. Snow falls in some years on the highest peaks. It has snowed in the town itself in 1983, 2000, 16 March 2011, 15 December 2013, 19 February 2014, and 24 to 26 January 2016, 11 January 2021. According to statistics, in the period from 1971 to this year, it has snowed in Sapa 21 times.

In common with the rest of northern Vietnam, Hoàng Liên National Park experiences a marked wet season from May to September, with the heaviest rainfall occurring in July and August. Humidity ranges from 75 to 91 percent with a yearly mean of 87 percent.

The climate varies considerably within the national park. The prevalent wind direction for most of the year is west to east, leading to cloud formation on the upper slopes of the Fansipan massif. These high-altitude areas are covered by cloud most days of the year and have very high humidity. Cloud also penetrates into the valleys but these areas are usually less humid than the mountain slopes. In the extreme east of the national park, around Ban Ho village, mean temperatures are considerably higher due to the lower altitude of these areas.

Humidity is relatively high all year round, between 83 and 87% and temperature ranges within 15-30 Celsius degree. Sapa can get quite cold at night during winter.

Geology

The geology of Hoàng Liên National Park includes metamorphosed sediments and a granitic intrusion. The metamorphosed sediments strike from north-west to south-east along the Muong Hoa valley. On the north-eastern side of the valley is a craggy ridge of marble and metamorphosed carbonate rocks that exhibit a karst style of weathering. These formations are currently being quarried for road building. The valley floor is characterised by schist and, to a lesser extent, gneiss. The granitic intrusion extends from the Muong Hoa River to the summit ridge of Fansipan and beyond. Due to the high humidity and rainfall in the area, chemical weathering is prevalent. This is reflected in the clay nature of the soil.

Economic and social development

Before the 1990s, the town's economy was mainly based on small size agriculture.

Tourist arrival between 1995 and 2003 grew from a total of 4,860 to 138,622. On average, 79% of the visitors are Vietnamese and 21% are foreigners.

The people of the Sa Pa area have been very poor even by Vietnam's rural standards. Efforts to improve the situation for the local people include both governmental and non-governmental initiatives. The government of Vietnam and foreign governments have contributed to local development programs. International non-governmental organizations such as Oxfam have also been involved in Sa Pa. Locally, the Hmong-run social enterprise, Sapa O'Chau, organizes volunteer placements, such as English teaching, and visiting through trekking and homestays at local villages for short or long-term periods. Vocational training by the Hoa Sua School also aims to increases skills and earnings potential for local residents.

Hydrology

Hoàng Liên National Park is drained by the Muong Hoa and Ta Trung Ho rivers, which feed the Nam Po River and, finally, the Song Hong (Red) river. The forest has an essential role in water catchment protection, particularly the forest at high altitudes, which is frequently covered in cloud. Water condenses on the vegetation and falls as ‘occult’ precipitation. Occult precipitation makes a major contribution to stream-flow during the dry season when rainfall is low.

Vegetation
The forest of Hoàng Liên National Park can be classified as belonging to 3 types: sub-montane dry evergreen forest, tropical montane deciduous forest and sub-alpine forest. The sub-montane dry evergreen forest, which occurs at lower altitudes, has been the most heavily disturbed by the activities of man.

In addition to the forest habitats, the national park contains large areas of agricultural land, scrub land and Savannah. Agriculture is concentrated at altitudes below 1,500m, in the bottom of valleys. Scrub land and Savannah areas are found where forest has been cleared: around the edge of cultivated areas and on ridge tops, which have been subjected to burning.
A final vegetation type represented at Hoàng Liên National Park is dwarf bamboo. This habitat is confined to the highest ridges of the Fansipan massif, at altitudes above 2,800 m.

Notes

References 

 Forbes, Andrew, and Henley, David: 'Sapa and the north-west' in: Vietnam Past and Present: The North (History and culture of Hanoi and Tonkin). Chiang Mai. Cognoscenti Books, 2012. ASIN: B006DCCM9Q.
 Michaud, J. and S. Turner, 2006: Contending Visions of Sa Pa, A Hill-Station in Viet Nam. Annals of Tourism Research. Vol 33, no 3, 785–808.
 Michaud, J. and S. Turner, 2003: Tribulations d'un marché de montagne. Sapa, province de Lao Cai, Vietnam. Études rurales. n° 165–166, janvier-juin. 53–80.
 Turner, S. 2007: Trading Old Textiles: the Selective Diversification of Highland Livelihoods in Northern Vietnam. Human Organization. 66 (4), 389–404.

External links

 Oxfam in Vietnam (PDF)

Official website of the provincial government (Vietnamese)

Populated places in Lào Cai province
Districts of Lào Cai province
County-level towns in Vietnam
Lào Cai province